The 1973 Swedish Open – Doubles event was part of the 1973 Swedish Open tennis tournament and was played on outdoor clay courts in Båstad, Sweden between 8 July and 15 July 1973. Nikola Pilić and Stan Smith won the doubles title by defeating Bob Carmichael and Frew McMillan 2–6, 6–4, 6–4 in the final.

Draw

Finals

Top half

Bottom half

References

External links
 ATP doubles draw
 ITF tournament edition details

Men's doubles
Doubles